Mitchell Corporation (株式会社ミッチェル) was a Japanese video game developer based in the Suginami ward of Tokyo. Roy Ozaki served as president, and Koichi Niida served as vice-president. Some employees were former Capcom and TAD Corporation employees.  The company was originally established on February 1, 1960, as an import/export business by the father of Roy Ozaki. Ozaki and Niida took over the company and began acting as exclusive overseas agents for such video game companies as Visco, Video System, Seta, Metro, Home Data, and other small video game manufacturers in the 1980s.

Company activity was suspended on 20 November 2012.

Mitchell Corporation developed titles for home consoles, handhelds, Japanese mobile phones, the arcade and interactive kiosks located in restaurants and other places.  Mitchell also distributed printed circuit boards for the arcade/coin-op market. The company also developed video games for other publishers. Starting in  2004, they started developing games only for Nintendo hardware.

Mitchell Corporation is best known as the game developer of Puzz Loop. Copyright and trademark registration of Puzz Loop was established in December 1999, the same year it was released to the international coin-op arcade market. Prior to this, it developed the Buster Bros. series of games.

Puzz Loop was first released in North America, as well as Europe, under the title Ballistic for the original PlayStation console and Game Boy Color handheld. Infogrames published the PlayStation and Game Boy Color versions in North America in late 1999, while THQ published these same versions for European territories. Capcom published both versions for the Japanese market under the original Puzz Loop title in 2000.

Nintendo of America released Puzz Loop for the Nintendo DS under the title Magnetica on June 5, 2006. A four-player version, titled Magnetica Twist was released two years later on the WiiWare service. Tokyo Crash Mobs is the latest instalment of the Puzz Loop series.

Games

References

External links
   (Archives) 
 Interview with Mitchell's Roy Ozaki
 Archive.org: Puzz Loop history from Mitchell Corporation (in Japanese & English)
 Iwata Asks: Wii Play Motion (Nintendo developer roundtable interview)
 cubed3 Sujin Taisen Interview (Developer interview)

Software companies based in Tokyo
Video game companies established in 1960
Video game development companies
Video game companies disestablished in 2012
Japanese companies disestablished in 2012
Defunct video game companies of Japan
Japanese companies established in 1960